The booted warbler (Iduna caligata) is an Old World warbler in the tree warbler group. It was formerly considered to be conspecific with Sykes's warbler, but the two are now usually both afforded species status. Booted warbler itself breeds from central Russia to western China, and migrates to winter in the Indian subcontinent as far south as Sri Lanka. Booted warbler has expanded its breeding range westward in recent decades and nests now as far west and north as Finland.
It is a small passerine bird, found in open country with bushes and other tall vegetation. Three or four eggs are laid in a nest in a bush or vegetation.  Like most warblers they are insectivorous.

These are small warblers, especially compared to others in their genus. They are pale brown above and whitish below with buff flanks. The outer tail feathers have pale edges. They have a short pale supercilium, and the bill is strong and pointed. Sykes's warbler is larger and greyer than the booted warbler, and most resembles an eastern olivaceous warbler.

Keyserling and Blasius gave no explanation of the genus name Iduna, though in Norse mythology Iðunn, or Iduna, is the goddess of spring and fertility who was changed into a sparrow (or a nut) to enable her rescue by Loki. The specific caligata  is Latin for "booted" from caliga, "boot".

Gallery

References

booted warbler
Birds of Russia
booted warbler